Dolling or Dölling is a surname. Notable people with the surname include:

Alison Dolling (1917–2006), Australian writer
Charlie Dolling (1886-1936), Australian doctor, cricketer and cricket administrator
Emmi Dölling (1906–1990), Czechoslovak/German political activist and journalist
Hazel Dolling (1923/24-2006), British chatelaine
Irene Dölling (born 1942), German sociologist
Iwo Dölling (1923–2019), Swedish diplomat
Peter Dolling (born 1941), Australian rules footballer
Robert Dolling (1851–1902), British Anglo-Catholic Anglican priest